= Non functional pad =

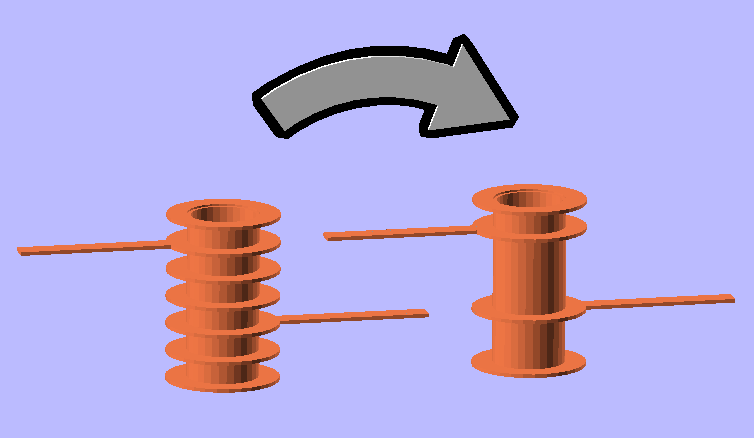
Non-functional pad removal

Illustration how an inner layer looks with and without non-functional pads

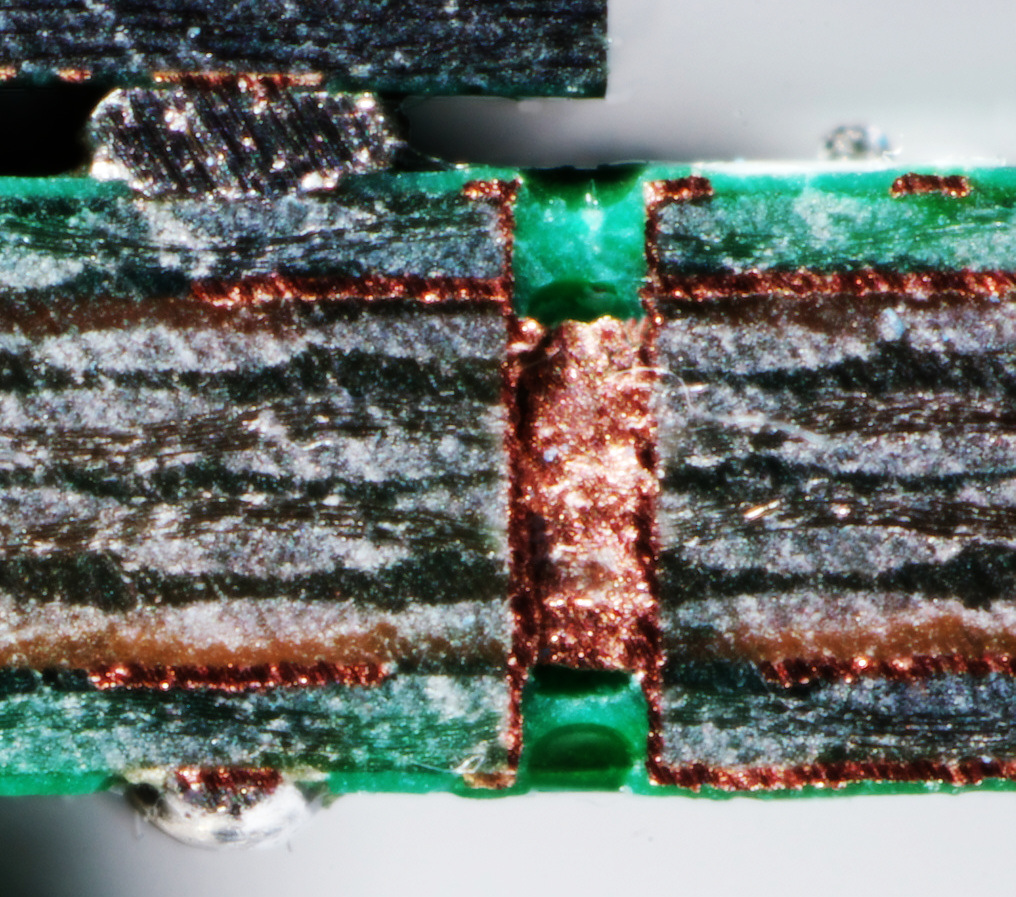
This via has the non-functional pad on layer 3 removed

A non-functional pad is a pad in a printed circuit board that is not connected to a track on the layer it is on.

== Removal ==
Non-functional pads can be removed at any phase of the design process. Some software allows precise control during the design process, and also removes the non-functional pads during output file creation. Furthermore, some board manufacturers remove non-functional pads during data preparations.

Occasionally, this process of non-functional pad removal is also called unused pad suppression.

The benefits of removing the non-functional pads are limited. Electrically, it creates needless extra capacitance in certain designs, which needs to be removed. Removing non-functional pads can improve the drilling process, as it lessens drill wear.

Non-functional pad removal can influence the reliability. (e.g. barrel cracking failure mode). Removal can increase or decrease reliability. Depending on design parameters, removing the non-functional pads can free up routing space.

Non-functional pads naturally also affect thermal characteristics.

Sometimes, non-functional pads (or their removal) are used for copper balancing, which affects etching, bow and twist and other effects.

== Bibliography ==
- Non-functional Pads: Should They Stay or Should They Go
- Pads/Nopads
- "non-functional pad | European Cooperation for Space Standardization". ecss.nl.
